Paladin Group may refer to:

 Paladin Group (fascist organization), a far right mercenary group which existed during Francoist Spain
 Paladin Group (security company), a private security contractor which operates in Oceania and Southeast Asia

See also
 Paladin (disambiguation)